The events of 1974 in anime.

Releases

See also
1974 in animation

External links 
Japanese animated works of the year, listed in the IMDb

Anime
Anime
Years in anime